Ahmed Hadjali (born June 16, 1976) is an Algerian handball player currently playing for French club US Ivry Handball and the Algerian National Team. He plays as a right wing.

Hadjali was selected in the Algerian team for the 2009 World Men's Handball Championship in Croatia.

References

1976 births
Living people
People from Boghni
Kabyle people
Algerian male handball players
21st-century Algerian people